WRDX (92.9 FM) is a radio station licensed to serve Smyrna, Delaware. It is owned by iHeartMedia, Inc., and airs a hot adult contemporary format.

The station was assigned its call letters by the Federal Communications Commission on September 7, 2007, when it swapped with sister station WDSD.

Format flips
On October 21, 2008, WRDX dropped its hot adult contemporary format as "The River" for adult hits as "Tom FM".

On March 1, 2014, WRDX changed their format back to hot adult contemporary, still under the "Tom FM" branding.

On September 3, 2014, WRDX rebranded as "Mix 92.9".

On July 1, 2016, WRDX changed their format to Hot AC, branded as "92.9 Tom FM".

On either November 6 or November 7, 2020, November 5 2021 and November 11 2022 WRDX changed its format from Hot AC to Christmas music still branded as TOM FM, but changed its slogan to, "Delaware's Christmas Station".

On December 26, 2020, WRDX ended holiday music programming and resumed normal programming (Hot Adult Contemporary) under 92.9 TOM FM and same thing in 2021 and 2022 .

Previous logos

References

External links
 WRDX official website

RDX
Radio stations established in 1993
1993 establishments in Delaware
IHeartMedia radio stations